Q. M. Pyne Store, also known as the Palisades Restaurant, is a historic country store located at Eggleston, Giles County, Virginia. It consists of two multi-story, brick masonry structures, attached side by side and embanked into a hillside. The north building was completed in 1926 and appended with a similar building on the south side about 1929. The north building is three stories and measures 70 feet deep and 40 feet wide. It has a flat roof, parapet and sign tablet, with a windowed storefront below. The building housed C.C. Whittaker & Company, a general store; a Chevrolet Dealership, with a showroom and a place to repair cars; a doctor's office; and the United States Post Office until it moved to its new location in the 1980s.

It was listed on the National Register of Historic Places in 2009.

References

Commercial buildings on the National Register of Historic Places in Virginia
Commercial buildings completed in 1929
Buildings and structures in Giles County, Virginia
National Register of Historic Places in Giles County, Virginia